Magenta is a railway station in the Italian town of Magenta. The station was opened on 18 June 1858 by the Austrian Empire, and is located on the Turin–Milan railway. The train services are operated by Trenitalia and Trenord.

The station was the set of the battle of Magenta, which also gave the name to the Magenta station in Paris.

Train services
The station is served by the following services:

Express services (Regionale Veloce) Turin - Chivasso – Vercelli – Novara – Milan
Milan Metropolitan services (S6) Novara - Milan - Treviglio

See also

 History of rail transport in Italy
 List of railway stations in Lombardy
 Rail transport in Italy
 Railway stations in Italy

References

External links

Railway stations in Lombardy
Railway stations opened in 1858
Milan S Lines stations